Courting Disaster is a Nancy Drew and Hardy Boys Supermystery crossover novel, published in 1993.

Plot summary
In Charleston, South Carolina, Nancy Drew is observing the rehearsal of Beauty and the Beat, a rock n' roll musical starring famous T.V. sensation Terry Alford. Things go well until, suddenly, Terry is attacked by a masked assailant. Meanwhile, at a resort off the Carolina coast, the Hardys serve as protection for Pat Flynn, tennis superstar. They soon realize they are working the same case and try to find an answer.

References

External links
Supermystery series books

Supermystery
1993 American novels
1993 children's books
Novels set in South Carolina
Charleston, South Carolina in fiction